The Hound of London is a television film directed by Peter Reynolds-Long and starring Patrick Macnee as Arthur Conan Doyle's character Sherlock Holmes.

Plot
At the request of Inspector Lestrade (Colin Skinner), Sherlock Holmes (Patrick Macnee) investigates a double murder at the Strand Theatre, with the assistance of Dr John Watson (John Scott-Paget).

Cast
Patrick Macnee – Sherlock Holmes
John Scott-Paget – Dr. Watson
Colin Skinner – Inspector Lestrade
Jack Macreath – Moriarty
Craig Bowlsby – Lance Sterling
Sophia Thornley – Mrs. Hudson
Carolyn Wilkinson – Irene Norton
Drew Kemp – Campbell
Ned Lemley – Stonegrimble
Ed Belanger – Striker
Dale Kelly – Gadsby
Rob Vanderbrink – King of Bohemia
Colleen Bignell – Queen of Bohemia
David Wood – The Body

Production
The screenplay was derived from a play written by Craig Bowlsby and first performed in September 1987 in Burnaby, British Columbia. For the film version, it was entirely recast with the exception of Colleen Bignell who played Irene Norton in the play and the Queen of Bohemia in the film.

Patrick Macnee was cast as Sherlock Holmes. Previously, Macnee had portrayed Watson three times: once to Roger Moore's Sherlock Holmes in a 1976 TV movie, Sherlock Holmes in New York and twice with Christopher Lee (Incident at Victoria Falls and Sherlock Holmes and the Leading Lady). This film made Macnee one of only a small number of actors to have played both Sherlock Holmes and Dr. Watson. According to Allen Eyles, actors who played both roles include Reginald Owen (Watson in the 1932 film Sherlock Holmes, and then Holmes in 1933's A Study in Scarlet), Jeremy Brett (Watson on stage in The Crucifer of Blood and Holmes on television in The Adventures of Sherlock Holmes), Carleton Hobbs (who played both roles in British radio adaptations), and Howard Marion-Crawford (who played Holmes on radio and Watson on television). There are also other actors who played both roles such as H. Lawrence Leyton, who played both on stage.

Reception
Author Alan Barnes claimed the film was "Cheap, nasty and painful to watch", and he described Macnee's Holmes as "a truly dreadful Holmes, wheezing out every line while resembling nothing less than an unshelled tortoise poured into a monkey suit."

References

External links

1993 television films
1993 films
Sherlock Holmes films based on works by Arthur Conan Doyle
Canadian television films
English-language Canadian films
1993 in Canadian television
1990s English-language films
1990s Canadian films